FCE may refer to:

 Cottesloe railway station, in Australia
 FC Energie Cottbus, a German football team
 FC Edmonton, a Canadian soccer team
 FC Eintracht Rheine, a German football team
 FCE Ultra, a Nintendo Entertainment System emulator
 Feed conversion efficiency
 Feedback-controlled electromigration
 Ferrovia Circumetnea, a railway on Sicily
 Fianarantsoa-Côte Est railway in Madagascar
 Final consumption expenditure
 Final Cut Express, a video editing application
 Finnish Cinema Editors, association of Finnish Cinema Editors, F.C.E.
 FireChaser Express, an upcoming roller coaster at Dollywood
 First Certificate in English, also known as Cambridge English: First
 Focal choroidal excavation, an eye disease
 Fondo de Cultura Económica, a Mexican publishing house
 FCE USA, their American subsidiary
 Forest City Enterprises, an American real estate firm
 Free Church of England
 Functional capacity evaluation